Park Mal-sim (born 15 July 1965) is a South Korean former professional tennis player.

Park appeared in seven ties for South Korea in the Federation Cup, four in 1988 and three in 1990. All of her matches were in singles and she won four rubbers, which included a win over Japan's top player Etsuko Inoue.

On the professional tour, Park reached a best singles ranking of 386 and won four ITF titles.

At the 1990 Asian Games in Beijing she won a singles bronze medal for South Korea and was also a member of the bronze medal winners in the team event.

ITF finals

Singles (4–2)

Doubles (2–1)

References

External links
 
 
 

1965 births
Living people
South Korean female tennis players
Asian Games bronze medalists for South Korea
Asian Games medalists in tennis
Tennis players at the 1990 Asian Games
Medalists at the 1990 Asian Games
20th-century South Korean women